Thomas Allan (born in Glasgow, Scotland) was a footballer who played in The Football League for Sunderland. He also played for Scottish Football League clubs Heart of Midlothian (two spells) and Motherwell.

References

Scottish footballers
Sunderland A.F.C. players
Motherwell F.C. players
Heart of Midlothian F.C. players
Rutherglen Glencairn F.C. players
English Football League players
Year of birth missing
Year of death missing
Scottish Football League players
Scottish Football League representative players
Association football goalkeepers
Footballers from Glasgow
19th-century births
20th-century deaths
Scottish Junior Football Association players